Pete Bucknall (born 24 August 1982) is a professional rugby union player for Leeds Carnegie

His primary position is prop.

Pete played rugby in the unbeaten St Ignatius 1st XV of 1999–2000 (Middlesex Champions for the only time in the school's history.)

He studied at Warwick University where he enjoyed an active social life, being the captain of the influential debating society and the club secretary of the Asian Films Club.

Pete's nickname is "Pistol Pete" Frank Eaton on account of his acerbic wit being as fast as the legendary Frank Eaton's pistol. He now teaches History at Princethorpe College.

References

External links

1982 births
Living people
English rugby union players
Leeds Tykes players
Rugby union players from Enfield
Rugby union props